Don't Disturb This Groove may refer to:
 "Don't Disturb This Groove" (song), a 1987 song by The System
 Don't Disturb This Groove (album), a 1987 album by The System